Strange Days is the second studio album by the American rock band the Doors, released on September 25, 1967, by Elektra Records. After the successful release of The Doors, the band started working on new and old material as well in early 1967 for their second record. Upon release, Strange Days reached number three on the US Billboard 200, and eventually earned RIAA platinum certification. It contains the two Top 30 hit singles, "People Are Strange" and "Love Me Two Times".

Despite the album's failure to match the success of its predecessor, according to author David V. Moskowitz it was "arguably the one the band itself most appreciated musically and creatively".

Recording and concept

Strange Days was recorded during tour breaks between May and August 1967 at Sunset Sound Recorders in Hollywood (the same studio as their first LP). In contrast to the 1966 sessions, producer Paul A. Rothchild and engineer Bruce Botnick employed a then cutting-edge 8-track recording machine. The protracted sessions allowed the band to experiment in the studio and further augment their sound with unusual instrumentation and sonic manipulation. According to Botnick, this approach was inspired by the band obtaining an advance copy of the Beatles' Sgt. Pepper's Lonely Hearts Club Band and "absolutely flipping out" at what they heard. Botnick said that, following the Beatles' example, the Doors were determined to pursue "new techniques of recording. No holds barred."

Unlike The Doors, Strange Days incorporates various instruments, ranging from marimba to Moog synthesizer, which has been described as one of the first uses of the synth in rock music history. The contribution of the synthesizer was programmed with the help of Paul Beaver and played by lead singer Jim Morrison. Session musician Doug Lubahn occasionally played bass during the recording of the album.

The band explored musique concrète techniques during the album's recording sessions.
While recording "Unhappy Girl" for example, keyboardist Ray Manzarek played his keyboard introduction backwards, and the corresponding overdubs were later made. On the track "Horse Latitudes", Botnick took the white noise of a tape recorder and varied the speed by hand-winding it (resulting in a sound akin to wind) as the four band members played a variety of instruments in unusual ways. Further varispeed was then employed to create different timbres and effects.

Composition 
Strange Days has been described alternately by music critics as acid rock, psychedelic pop, psychedelic rock, or simply psychedelia; Barney Hoskyns labelled it as "post-psychedelic pop". Several of the album's songs had been written around the same time as the ones that appeared on The Doors. Two ("My Eyes Have Seen You" and "Moonlight Drive") had been demoed in 1965 at Trans World Pacific Studios before Krieger joined the group; indeed, the latter had been conceived by Morrison prior to his fateful reunion with Manzarek in the summer of 1965. Although the song was attempted twice during the sessions for the band's debut, both versions were deemed unsatisfactory. A conventional blues arrangement, "Moonlight Drive" features a defining slightly off-beat rhythm and Krieger's bottleneck guitar, which create an eerie sound.

The LP's first single, "People Are Strange", was composed in early 1967 after Krieger, drummer John Densmore, and a depressed Morrison had walked to the top of Laurel Canyon. Densmore recalled the song's writing process in his book Riders on the Storm: Densmore and Krieger, who had then been roommates, were visited by a dejected Morrison, who was acting "deeply depressed." At the suggestion of Densmore, they took a walk along Laurel Canyon. Morrison returned from the walk "euphoric" with the early lyrics of "People Are Strange".

Although Morrison was the Doors' primary songwriter, Krieger wrote several of the group's hit singles, with his first composition being "Light My Fire". His bluesy "Love Me Two Times" was about a soldier/sailor on his last day with his girlfriend before shipping out, ostensibly to war. Manzarek said lyrically the song can be about "lust and loss, or multiple orgasms, I'm not sure which." Manzarek played the final version of this song on a harpsichord, which Manzarek described as "a most elegant instrument that one does not normally associate with rock and roll." It was edited to a 2:37 length and released as the second single (after "People Are Strange") from the album, and reached No. 25 on the charts in the US. Upon release, "Love Me Two Times" was considered to be somewhat risqué for radio airplay, and was banned in New Haven, Connecticut, for being "too controversial", much to the dismay of the band.

"Horse Latitudes" showcases Morrison's spoken-word poetry, who confirmed that he penned the poem during his high school years. However, Manzarek had mentioned that he never believed he wrote "Horse Latitudes" at such a young age, claiming the words were "too mature". The album concludes with the 11 minute-long epic, "When the Music's Over", whose keyboard part was inspired by Herbie Hancock's "Watermelon Man".

Release and packaging 

Strange Days was released on September 25, 1967, by Elektra Records. Although the album was quite successful, reaching No. 3 in the United States during a sixty-three-week chart stay in November 1967, its impact was attenuated by the enduring success of the band's debut album, which remained in the Top Ten over ten months after its release during a 122-week stay. According to music journalist Stephen Davis, Strange Days also proved to be the Doors' "worst-selling album" in their career with Morrison.

The album cover of Strange Days, photographed by Joel Brodsky, depicts a group of street performers in New York. The location of the photograph is at Sniffen Court, a residential alley next to East 36th Street between Lexington and Third Avenue in Manhattan. Actual street performers could not be located for all of the designated roles, so Brodsky's assistant stood in as a juggler while a random cab driver was paid $5 to pose playing the trumpet. Twin dwarfs were hired, with one appearing on the front cover and one appearing on the back cover, which is the other half of the same photo on the front cover. However, a group shot of the band does appear on a poster in the background of both covers, bearing captions of the band and album name. (The same photograph previously appeared on the back cover of the band's debut album.) Because of the subtlety of the artist and album title, most record stores put stickers across the cover to help customers identify it more clearly.

Critical reception 

Apart from its lower commercial performance compared to The Doors, contemporary reviews for Strange Days were generally positive. Rolling Stone opined that the album "has all the power and energy of the first LP, but is more subtle, more intricate and much more effective" and argued that the "whole album, individual songs and especially the final track are constructed in the five parts of tragedy. Like Greek drama, you know when the music's over because there is catharsis." Gene Youngblood of L.A. Free Press wrote a glowing review, noting the Doors musical style as a "more surreal than psychedelic, it is more anguish than acid." Robert Christgau called the album "muscular but misshapen" in a May 1968 column for Esquire, but went on to write that the Doors had come "from nowhere to reign as America's heaviest group".

Retrospective reviews to the album have been equally favourable.
In 2007, on the occasion of the release of the 40th anniversary edition, Sal Cinquemani of Slant Magazine,  argued that "while The Doors had more frequent, obvious peaks, the quirky Strange Days is a more ambitious, unified work. There are fewer filler tracks and each song carries as much weight as the one before and after it" and called it "a document of a sometimes beautiful, sometimes scary, and often twisted era of fear and idealism." It has also been ranked highly in lists; in 2012, the record was listed at No. 409 on Rolling Stone magazine's list of  The 500 Greatest Albums of All Time, and the same magazine included it on their 2007 list "The 40 Essential Albums of 1967". Strange Days was placed in the twentieth position on Ultimate Classic Rocks list of the "Top 25 Psychedelic Rock Albums", while Q magazine ranked it 35th on their respective list.

Some critics feel it does not quite match up to its predecessor. The Rolling Stone Album Guide wrote, "With the exceptions of hard blues, 'Love Me Two Times,' and the rock tango, 'Moonlight Drive,' Strange Days didn't have the power of The Doors". In his retrospective AllMusic review of the album, Richie Unterberger notes, "Many of the songs on Strange Days had been written around the same time as the ones that appeared on The Doors, and with hindsight one has the sense that the best of the batch had already been cherry picked for the debut album. For that reason, the band's second effort isn't as consistently stunning as their debut," but he also expressed that overall "it's a very successful continuation of the themes of their classic album."

Track listing

Original album 
All tracks are written by the Doors (Jim Morrison, Ray Manzarek, Robby Krieger, and John Densmore). Details are taken from the 1967 U.S. Elektra release; other releases may show different information.

Reissues

Personnel 
The liner notes for the 1967 U.S. Elektra album and the 2007 Rhino Records CD 40th Anniversary Edition liner notes with accompanying essays by Bruce Botnick and Barney Hoskyns may differ from other sources.

The Doors
 Jim Morrisonvocals, moog synthesizer on "Strange Days"
 Ray Manzarekkeyboards, marimba, harpsichord on "Love Me Two Times"
 Robby Kriegerguitar
 John Densmoredrums

Additional musicians
 Doug Lubahnbass guitar (except on "Unhappy Girl", "Horse Latitudes" and "When the Music's Over")
 Paul Beavermoog synthesizer programming on "Strange Days"

Technical
 Paul A. Rothchildproduction
 Bruce Botnickengineering
 Joel Brodskycover photography
 William S. Harveycover concept and art direction

Charts 
Album

Singles

Certifications

References

Sources

External links 
 

The Doors albums
Elektra Records albums
1967 albums
Albums produced by Paul A. Rothchild
Albums with cover art by Joel Brodsky
Albums recorded at Sunset Sound Recorders